Troy Harold Seals (born November 16, 1938, in Bighill, Madison County, Kentucky, United States) is an American singer, songwriter, and guitarist.

He is a member of the prominent Seals family of musicians that includes Jim Seals (of Seals and Crofts), Dan Seals (of England Dan & John Ford Coley), Brady Seals (Little Texas and Hot Apple Pie), and Johnny Duncan. During the 1970s, Seals recorded with Lonnie Mack and Doug Kershaw and although he made two albums of his own, he is best known as a songwriter. His compositions have been recorded by artists such as Joe Cocker, Eric Clapton, Nancy Sinatra, Randy Travis, Conway Twitty, Hank Williams Jr., Elvis Presley, Roy Orbison, Levon Helm, and Jerry Lee Lewis. George Jones' "Who's Gonna Fill Their Shoes," was co-written with Max D. Barnes.

Seals has played guitar on numerous sessions for recording stars and has collaborated on compositions with Waylon Jennings, Vince Gill, Will Jennings and others. He has had three co-written compositions nominated for the Country Music Association "Song of the Year" award: "Seven Spanish Angels" (1985), "Lost in the Fifties Tonight" (1986), and  "If You Ever Have Forever In Mind" (1999). He also co-wrote "L.A. Lady" for the New Riders of the Purple Sage, along with Will Jennings and Donald Clint Goodman. "L.A. Lady" was also recorded by Dobie Gray.

In recognition of his successful career, Seals was inducted into the Nashville Songwriters Hall of Fame.

Singles

AB-side to "Star of the Bar."

References

External links
 

1938 births
American country guitarists
American male guitarists
American country singer-songwriters
American male singer-songwriters
Country musicians from Kentucky
Living people
People from Madison County, Kentucky
Singer-songwriters from Kentucky
Guitarists from Kentucky
20th-century American guitarists
20th-century American male musicians